The Free Market Forum is a right-wing think tank associated with the Institute of Economic Affairs, launched in September 2022.

It has been described as a successor to the Free Enterprise Group set up by British Prime Minister Liz Truss, and as of 2022 the website of the former group redirects to the Free Market Forum website.

As of October 2022, the Free Market Forum listed the following MPs as supporters:

And the following members of the House of Lords:

References 

Think tanks
2022 establishments in the United Kingdom
Right-wing politics in the United Kingdom
Conservative Party (UK) factions
Liz Truss